Port-Margot is a commune in the Borgne Arrondissement, in the Nord department of Haiti. It has 36,937 inhabitants.

Communal Sections 
The commune consists of six communal sections, namely:
 Grande Plaine, rural
 Bas Petit Borgne, urban (town of Port-Margot) and rural
 Corail, rural
 Haut Petit Borgne, rural
 Bas Quartier, urban (Bayeux neighborhood) and rural
 Bras Gauche, urban (Petit Bourg de Port-Margot neighborhood) and rural

References

Populated places in Nord (Haitian department)
Communes of Haiti